The Tara River Canyon, also known as the Tara River Gorge, is the largest and deepest canyon in Europe, which is for the most part located in Montenegro, and to a smaller extent in Bosnia and Herzegovina. The most attractive part of the canyon are the high rocks of the mountain range of Ljubišnja, which are located in the UNESCO World Heritage Site of Durmitor National Park.

Geography 
The park's right and left sides from the point of Crna Poda near the town of Mojkovac belong to the Municipality of Pljevlja. The last 36 kilometers form the border between Bosnia and Herzegovina and Montenegro. Tara River Canyon is one of the deepest river canyons in Europe.

Within Montenegro the canyon is protected as a part of Durmitor National Park and is a UNESCO World Heritage Site.

The canyon features rocky and pebbly terraces, sandy beaches, high cliffs, and more than 80 large caves.

Tara River 
The Tara River becomes the Drina at the point of confluence with the Piva near Hum, and is some hundred and fifty kilometers long at that point. In the park, the river has a mean fall of 3.6 meters/kilometer, with a host of cascades, offering whitewater between category 2 and 4.

The river gets large quantities of water from abundant wellsprings and a few short tributaries. The most important left bank tributaries are the Ljutica and the Sušica, while the most important right bank tributaries are the Vaskovaćka Rijeka and the Draga. The most important wellspring is the Bajlovića Sige, located on the right bank, contributing a few hundred liters per second. The water pouring from the Bučevica Cave falls into the Tara more than thirty metres high, and more than a hundred and fifty meters wide. 

The roar from the cascades can be heard from the canyon peaks. Among the more than forty cascades, the most famous are Đavolje Lazi, Sokolovina, Bijeli Kamen, Gornji Tepački Buk and Donji Tepački Buk. 

Because of the quality of its water, and because of its unique ecological system, Tara in 1977 was put into the program “Čovjek i biosfera” (Human and Biosphere) and entered into the world's ecological biosphere reservations, protecting it under an international convention.

The river  together with the Drina river, is Europe's main habitat and spawning ground for huchen (Hucho hucho).

Dam controversy
The governments of Montenegro and the Republika Srpska entity in Bosnia and Herzegovina had plans to flood a considerable part of the gorge, to construct one or more hydroelectric dams on the Drina and possibly the Tara. A plan to construct dams in Bosnia and Herzegovina on the Drina river, has not been abandoned. 

One proposed dam at Buk Bijela village, some 15 kilometers downstream of border with Montenegro and the confluence of the Tara with the Piva river, the Buk Bijela Hydro Power Plant, although apparently abandoned in April 2005 after successful protests, was reconsidered as recently as 2018. A concession was given to HE Buk Bijela company created in Foča in 2018. A September 2006 cooperation agreement between Slovenian company Petrol and Montenegrin company Montenegro-bonus specified construction of a 40-60 megawatt hydroelectric plant.

Water sports
The canyon is part of the Tara River rafting route. The one-day rafting route runs from Brstnovica to Sćepan Polje. It is  miles long. This part of the canyon has the steepest drop in elevation. It includes 21 out of 50 rapids in that part of the Tara. The rapids are Brstanovići, Pećine, Celije and Vjernovički. The route begins with the waterfalls of Ljutica and passes under the 541 feet high monumental bridge. Next is the old Roman road and the Lever Tara. "Funjički Bukovi" and "Bijele Ploče" rapids are followed by "Nisovo Vrelo", the deepest part of the canyon. Further is the bottom of Curevac mountain that reaches .

In 2005 and 2009, the European Championships in Rafting were held in Bosnia and Herzegovina on the Vrbas and Tara rivers.

References

Canyons and gorges of Montenegro
World Heritage Sites in Montenegro
Tourist attractions in Montenegro
Environment of Montenegro
Tourist attractions in Bosnia and Herzegovina	
Protected areas of Bosnia and Herzegovina
Nature conservation in Bosnia and Herzegovina
Environment of Bosnia and Herzegovina
Canyons and gorges of Bosnia and Herzegovina